KRNH 92.3 The Ranch FM is a radio station licensed to Kerrville, Texas. The station broadcasts a country music format and is owned by Lyndell Grubbs, through licensee Radio Ranch, LLC.

History
The station began broadcasting in October 1990, holding the call sign KITE and airing a soft adult contemporary format. It originally broadcast at 92.1 MHz, but moved to 92.3 MHz in 1994, concurrent with a power increase. Its format shifted to mainstream AC in 1997. In 1998, the station adopted a classic rock format. In 2000, the station was sold to Lyndell Grubbs's Radio Ranch, LLC, for $245,000. In September 2000, the station's call sign was changed to KRNH and it adopted a country music format, with programming from ABC Radio's Real Country network.

Subchannels

Hill Country Patriot
In March 2018, KRNH launched a news-talk format branded "The Hill Country Patriot" on its HD2 subchannel, which is simulcast on translators at 104.3 FM in Kerrville and 102.1 FM in Fredericksburg, Texas.

The Raptor
On October 1, 2020, KRNH launched a classic rock format on its HD4 subchannel, branded "106.5 The Raptor", which is simulcast on 106.5 K293CY.

References

External links
KRNH's official website

RNH
Country radio stations in the United States
Radio stations established in 1990
1990 establishments in Texas